Goxhill is a small hamlet in the East Riding of Yorkshire, England in an area known as Holderness.

The village was a civil parish until 1935, when it was merged with Great Hatfield and Little Hatfield to form the parish of Hatfield.

The parish church of St Giles is a Grade II listed building.

In 1823 Goxhill parish was in the Wapentake and Liberty of Holderness. At the time the parish church was undergoing repairs, begun in 1818. Population was 70, which included five farmers. In 1840 population was 65, again with five farmers, the parish land of  the property of Rev Charles Constable, who had been patron of the St Giles Church incumbent since 1823.

Goxhill was served from 1865 to 1953 by Wassand railway station on the Hull and Hornsea Railway.

References

External links

Villages in the East Riding of Yorkshire
Holderness